Goddess of Democracy is a replica of the original Goddess of Democracy statue created during the Tiananmen Square protests of 1989, installed in San Francisco's Chinatown, in the U.S. state of California. The sculpture stands in Portsmouth Square.

References

External links

 

Chinatown, San Francisco
Outdoor sculptures in San Francisco
Sculptures of women in California
Statues in San Francisco